Give Us A Break was a 1995 album by Russian folk rock group Limpopo, who later became the Red Elvises.

Track listing

When My Dear Mother Was Seeing Me Off to The Army
Volga Boatmen
Half-Moon
Soldiers, The Brave Lads
Rowanberry Tree
Seni
Steppe
Odessa-Mama
Epic Song
Along the Street
By the Meadow
Nagaika
Wooden Log
Lemons Odessa-Mama
Luchina
Down Along the River

External links
 Official site

1995 albums
Red Elvises albums